Bernard Combes (born 13 March 1960) is a French politician. He is mayor of Tulle and general councillor of Roche-Canillac Canton.  In the 2017 French legislative election, he was the socialist candidate for Corrèze's 1st constituency, losing to En Marche's Christophe Jerretie in the second round.

References 

Living people
1960 births
21st-century French politicians
People from Tulle
Mayors of places in Nouvelle-Aquitaine
Socialist Party (France) politicians
French general councillors